Nicola Kuhn and Zsombor Piros won the boys' doubles tennis title at the 2017 French Open, defeating  Vasil Kirkov and Danny Thomas in the final, 6–4, 6–4.

Yshai Oliel and Patrik Rikl were the defending champions, but Rikl chose not to participate. Oliel played alongside Benjamin Sigouin, but lost in the first round to Axel Geller and Nicolás Mejía.

Seeds

Draw

Finals

Top half

Bottom half

External links 
 Draw

Boys' Doubles
2017